Shari is a rural locality (a selo) in Amukhsky Selsoviet, Agulsky District, Republic of Dagestan, Russia. The population was 19 as of 2010.

Geography 
It is located 31 km north of Tpig.

References 

Rural localities in Agulsky District